Homalanthus stillingiifolius is an Australian shrub in the spurge family (Euphorbiaceae). Mostly found in rocky areas in eucalyptus forest. Occasionally seen on the margins of rainforests.

References

Hippomaneae
Flora of New South Wales
Flora of Queensland